The Type 88 Surface-to-Ship Missile (88式地対艦誘導弾, SSM-1) is a truck-mounted anti-ship missile developed by Japan's Mitsubishi Heavy Industries in the late 1980s. It is a land-based version of the air-launched Type 80 (ASM-1) missile; in turn it was developed into the ship-launched Type 90 (SSM-1B) missile. The Japan Ground Self-Defense Force bought 54 transporter erector launchers, each carrying six Type 88 missiles, for use as coastal batteries.

In 2015, an upgrade of the Type 88 became operational called the Type 12. The Type 12 features INS with mid-course GPS guidance and better precision due to enhanced TERCOM and target discrimination capabilities.

Overview

The basic configuration composes the same launcher vehicles and loader vehicles (6 SSM-1), some radar vehicles, fire control systems, and a command control system.

Usually, the SSM-1 is launched from within  of the target.

See also
 Anti-ship missile
 Type 80 Air-to-Ship Missile
 Type 90 Ship-to-Ship Missile
 Type 93 Air-to-Ship Missile
 Type 12 Surface-to-Ship Missile
 XASM-3

References

Anti-ship missiles of Japan
Anti-ship cruise missiles
Type 88
Military vehicles introduced in the 1980s
Military equipment introduced in the 1980s

ru:Тип 80 ASM-1#SSM-1